M. Panneerselvam is an Indian politician and former Member of the Legislative Assembly of Tamil Nadu. He was elected to the Tamil Nadu legislative assembly from Sirkazhi constituency as a Dravida Munnetra Kazhagam (DMK) candidate in the 1989, 1996, and 2006 elections. He is the present MLA of Sirkazhi.He is an advocate.

Elections contested

References 

Dravida Munnetra Kazhagam politicians
Living people
Tamil Nadu MLAs 1996–2001
Tamil Nadu MLAs 2006–2011
Tamil Nadu MLAs 2021–2026
Year of birth missing (living people)